Arnold Briedis (born 20 August 1955) is a former Australian rules footballer who played for North Melbourne in the VFL during the 1970s.

A centre half-forward, Briedis was a member of North Melbourne's inaugural premiership side in 1975, kicking 5 goals in the grand final. In the 1977 VFL Grand Final, Briedis kicked seven points, and his inaccuracy at goal nearly cost North Melbourne the premiership when they drew with Collingwood; however, Briedis made amends by becoming the club's leading goalkicker in the decider when he kicked accurately with 5 goals. His tally of 38 goals in finals football was a record for North Melbourne until it was passed by Wayne Carey in the 1990s.
In 2010 Briedis was tasked to present the Norm Smith Medal. He infamously pronounced the winner, Collingwood's Scott Pendlebury, as "Scott Embery".
He is the older brother of North Melbourne teammate Robert Briedis.

References

External links

1955 births
Living people
Australian rules footballers from Victoria (Australia)
Australian people of Latvian descent
North Melbourne Football Club players
North Melbourne Football Club Premiership players
Two-time VFL/AFL Premiership players